al-Marawi'a  (المراوعة) is a city in Al Marawi'ah District in Al Hudaydah Governorate of Yemen.

In 2005 it had a population of 39,911 inhabitants and is the 19th largest town in Yemen.

References

Populated places in Al Hudaydah Governorate